Zhangping (POJ: Chiang-pêng) is a city in the southwest of Fujian province, People's Republic of China. It is under the administration of the prefecture-level city of Longyan.

Transport
Zhangping is a rail hub in southwestern Fujian, where the Yingtan–Xiamen Railway, Zhangping–Longchuan, and Zhangping–Quanzhou–Xiaocuo Railways converge.

Climate

Administrative divisions
Subdistricts:
Jingcheng Subdistrict, Guilin Subdistrict

Towns:
Xinqiao, Yongfu, Xinan, Shuangyang, Heping, Gongqiao, Xianghu, Chishui

Townships:
Luzhi Township, Xiyuan Township, Nanyang Township, Guantian Township, Wuci Township, Lingdi Township

References

County-level divisions of Fujian
Cities in Fujian
Longyan